Edda "Edy" Campagnoli (12 June 1934 – 6 February 1995) was an Italian television personality and actress.

Life and career 
Born in Milan, Campagnoli started her career as a runway model after World War II. In 1954 she played Venus in the opera La Vestale by Luchino Visconti. 

Campagnoli made her television debut in the program Vetrine, then, noticed by a RAI manager, in 1955 she was chosen as the assistant of Mike Bongiorno in the popular quiz show Lascia o raddoppia?. In spite of the controversies surrounding her ornamental role, for which she was nicknamed  (i.e. "the mute valet"), Campagnoli achieved a large popularity, as to be referred to as "the most famous woman in Italy". 

After abandoning the quiz show in 1959, Campagnoli appeared in a number of other television programs, then she left the showbusiness in mid-1960s to pursue a career as a fashion businesswoman. She died at 60 years old for the consequences of a stroke. She had been married to Italian football goalkeeper Lorenzo Buffon for a time, although they later divorced. She had previously also dated Buffon's career rival, goalkeeper Giorgio Ghezzi.

Filmography

References

External links 

Actresses from Milan
1934 births
Italian television personalities
Italian stage actresses
Italian film actresses
1995 deaths
20th-century Italian actresses
Buffon family